John Dreyer may refer to:
John Louis Emil Dreyer, Danish-Irish astronomer
John Dreyer (footballer), English footballer and manager